Valnoctamide (INN, USAN) has been used in France as a sedative-hypnotic since 1964. It is a structural isomer of valpromide, a valproic acid prodrug; unlike valpromide, however, valnoctamide is not transformed into its homologous acid, valnoctic acid, in vivo.

Indications
In addition to being a sedative, valnoctamide has been investigated for use in epilepsy.

It was studied for neuropathic pain in 2005 by Winkler et al., with good results: it had minimal effects on motor coordination and alertness at effective doses, and appeared to be equally effective as gabapentin.

RH Belmaker, Yuly Bersudsky and Alex Mishory started a clinical trial of valnoctamide for prophylaxis of mania in lieu of the much more teratogenic valproic acid or its salts.

Side effects
The side effects of valnoctamide are mostly minor and include somnolence and the slight motor impairments mentioned above.

Interactions
Valnoctamide is known to increase through inhibition of epoxide hydrolase the serum levels of carbamazepine-10,11-epoxide, the active metabolite of carbamazepine, sometimes to toxic levels.

Chemistry
Valnoctamide is a racemic compound with four stereoisomers, all of which were shown to be more effective than valproic acid in animal models of epilepsy and one of which [(2S,3S]-valnoctamide) was considered to be a good candidate by Isoherranen, et al. for an anticonvulsant in August 2003.

Butabarbital can be hydrolyzed to Valnoctamide.

References

Carboxamides
Anticonvulsants
GABA analogues
Mood stabilizers
GABA transaminase inhibitors
Histone deacetylase inhibitors
Prodrugs